Phreatia limenophylax, commonly known as the Norfolk Island caterpillar orchid is a plant in the orchid family and is an epiphyte with four to six fleshy, channelled leaves in a fan-like arrangement. A large number of tiny white flowers are arranged along a thin flowering stem. It is found on the Solomon Islands, Norfolk Island, and on some other islands of the southwest Pacific.

Description
Flowering occurs between January and April.

Taxonomy and naming
The Norfolk Island caterpillar orchid was first formally described in 1833 by Stephan Endlicher who gave it the name Plexaure limenophylax and published the description in Prodromus Florae Norfolkicae. The type specimen was collected by Ferdinand Bauer near Anson Bay on the western side of Norfolk Island. In 1873 George Bentham changed the name to Phreatia limenophylax. The specific epithet (limenophylax) is derived from the Ancient Greek prefix limeno- meaning "harbour", "haven" or "refuge" and phylax meaning "guard"

Distribution and habitat
Phreatia limenophylax usually grows on rainforest trees. It is found on the Solomon Islands, Norfolk Island, Fiji, New Caledonia, Samoa, Vanuatu and on Wallis and Futuna Islands. On Norfolk Island all five remaining specimens are found in the Mount Pitt section of the Norfolk Island National Park.

Conservation status
This orchid is classified as "critically endangered" under the Australian Government Environment Protection and Biodiversity Conservation Act 1999.

References

limenophylax
Plants described in 1833
Flora of Norfolk Island
Orchids of the Solomon Islands